Mircea Traian Sandu (born 22 October 1952 in Bucharest) is a retired Romanian footballer and president of the Romanian Football Federation.

Career
Mircea Sandu, nicknamed "Nașul" (The Godfather) was born on 22 October 1952 in Bucharest and started playing football at junior level at Școala Sportivă 2 București and Progresul București. He made his Divizia A debut on 30 August 1970 playing for Progresul București in a 1–0 victory against CFR Cluj. The following season he went to play for Sportul Studențesc București in Divizia B where he scored 15 goals in 28 matches, helping the team earn the promotion to the first league. The following 14 seasons Sandu played for Sportul Studențesc in Divizia A, also representing the club in 6 UEFA Cup matches in which he scored two goals and helped the club win the 1979–80 Balkans Cup. After his period spent at Sportul Studențesc, Sandu went to play for Gloria Buzău for one season, making his last Divizia A appearance on 21 September 1987 in a 1–0 victory against Universitatea Cluj in which he scored the goal. With 167 goals scored in 408 Divizia A matches, he is ranked seventh in the all-time scoring table. After he ended his playing career, Sandu was the president of the Romanian Football Federation between 1990 and 2014.

On 25 March 2008 he was decorated by President of Romania Traian Băsescu for Romania's successful Euro 2008 qualifying campaign with the Medalia "Meritul Sportiv" – (The Medal "The Sportive Merit") class III.

International career
Mircea Sandu made 16 appearances and scored 4 goals at international level for Romania, making his debut on 8 April 1972 when coach Angelo Niculescu used him in a friendly which ended with a 2–0 victory against France. His following game was Romania's biggest ever victory, a 9–0 against Finland at the 1974 World Cup qualifiers in which he scored two goals. Sandu also played in a 2–2 against Spain at the Euro 1976 qualifiers and played both legs of the successful 1977–80 Balkan Cup final, a 4–3 victory on aggregate against Yugoslavia. His following goals for the national team were in friendlies, a 2–2 against East Germany and a 2–1 loss against Israel. He played two games at the 1982 World Cup qualifiers, making his last appearance for the national team in a friendly which ended with a 1–0 victory against Denmark. Sandu also played two games for Romania's Olympic team at the 1976 Summer Olympics qualifiers scoring two goals in a 2–1 away victory against Denmark.

International goals
Scores and results list Romania's goal tally first, score column indicates score after each Sandu goal.

Personal life
Mircea Sandu's former wife who died in 1995, Simona Arghir was a handball player and their daughter Raluca was a professional tennis player. They also had a son named Dan Mircea. In 1997 he married Lisa Alban.

Honours
Sportul Studențesc
Balkans Cup (1): 1979–80, runner-up (1): 1976
Divizia A runner-up (1): 1985–86
Cupa României runner-up (1): 1978–79
Divizia B (1): 1971–72
Romania
Balkan Cup: 1977–80

Notes

References

External links
 
 
 Interview with Mircea Sandu Dolce-sport.ro 

1952 births
Living people
Romanian footballers
Romania international footballers
Liga I players
Liga II players
FC Progresul București players
FC Sportul Studențesc București players
FC Gloria Buzău players
Presidents of the Romanian Football Federation
Romanian sports executives and administrators
Association football forwards